Heads and Tails is a BBC TV's children's programme written and produced by Michael Cole with voices and music by Derek Griffiths. The 15 minute programme designed for pre-school children, featured archive and specially shot footage of domestic and wild animals. The narration was interspersed with comical conversations between animals and songs, often referring to certain animal characteristics in humorous ways, such as the nose of the proboscis monkey. The programme was first aired on BBC in 1977 with a second series in 1979.
In 1980 a vinyl LP was realised with songs written by  Cole and performed by Derek Griffiths.

Cole and Griffiths had previously worked together on Play School and  Bod.

Heads and Tails Vinyl LP  

Released in 1980 by BBC records, with lyrics by  Michael Cole and music by Derek Griffiths

Side 1 - Dog-a-Long

01 Heads and Tails / Wag-a-Lot / Dog-a-Long

02 Ladybird / Ants / Butterflies

03 Foxtrot Territory

04 Pigs On the Trot / Wallowing Good

05 Silence Too Has a Tale to Tell

06 Diving Ducks

07 Clumsy Swan

08 Gulls

09 Dig In Quick

Side 2 - The World Over

10 Life Gets Everywhere

11 Too Hot to Handle / Hey Mum!

12 The World Over

13 Run Cheetah Run

14 Coat of Many Colours

15 Proboscis Monkeys / Colobus Monkey

16 Home Is a Hole

17 Get Up and Go

References 

1970s British children's television series
BBC children's television shows
1977 British television series debuts